Anthony John Burton (born 1959) is an Anglican bishop.  He was formerly the Bishop of Saskatchewan in the Anglican Church of Canada. He was the rector of the Church of the Incarnation in Dallas, Texas, from 2008 to 2022. On February 13, 2022, Burton announced that he would retire as rector of the Church of the Incarnation in September 2022.

Burton was born in Ottawa, Ontario, Canada. He was educated at Trinity College at the University of Toronto; Dalhousie University in Halifax, Nova Scotia; and Wycliffe Hall, Oxford.

Burton was ordained in the Diocese of Nova Scotia in 1987, where he served in two parishes on Cape Breton Island. In 1991 he moved to Prince Albert, Saskatchewan, where he served as Dean of Saskatchewan and Rector of St. Alban’s Cathedral before being elected as bishop of the Diocese of Saskatchewan in 1993. At the time of his election Burton was the youngest bishop in the worldwide Anglican Communion and the youngest Canadian bishop of the 20th century. He spent a term as the chair of the Council of the North and also served as a co-chair of the Canadian Anglican-Roman Catholic Dialogue, as the Episcopal Visitor to the South American Mission Society, and as patron or officer of a variety of institutions, societies, and organizations.  He was a member of the Council of General Synod (the executive committee of General Synod) and of the council's planning committee.

From 2008 to 2022 Burton was the rector of the Church of the Incarnation in Dallas, Texas. He is also the chairman of the Board of Trustees of the Elliott House of Studies, a visitor of Ralston College, and a member of the Steering Committee of the Communion Partner Rectors. He serves on the board of trustees of The Anglican Digest.

References

External links
Official website
Communion Partner Rectors website
Church of the Incarnation website
Profile on the Diocese of Saskatchewan website

1959 births
Living people
Canadian Anglican priests
Anglican Church of Canada bishops
Clergy from Ottawa
Anglican bishops of Saskatchewan
Alumni of Wycliffe Hall, Oxford
Trinity College (Canada) alumni
University of Toronto alumni